Štefan Banič (23 November 1870 – 2 January 1941) was a Slovak inventor who patented an early parachute design.

Born in Jánostelek (Smolenická Nová Ves), Austria-Hungary (now Smolenická Nová Ves, a part of Smolenice, Slovakia), Banič immigrated to the United States and worked as a coal miner in Greenville, Pennsylvania.  After witnessing a plane crash in 1912, Banič constructed a prototype of a parachute in 1913 and was granted US patent, No. 1,108,484.

The design which was radically different from others - it was a kind of umbrella attached to the body - but it is sometimes claimed that he successfully tested it in Washington, D.C. jumping first from a 15-story building and subsequently from an airplane in 1914. He donated his patent to the U.S. Army - but there is no evidence that it was ever used.

After World War I Banič returned to Czechoslovakia where he helped to explore the Driny karst cave in the foothills of the Little Carpathian Mountains, close to his hometown of Smolenice.

Legacy
In 1997, US skydiver Slavo Mulik, also born in Slovakia, created the Stefan Banic Parachute Foundation which offers bronze, silver and gold medal awards to individuals involved in events, promotions and/or celebrations of skydiving, in memory of Banic.

In 2006, Slovak military paratroopers installed a memorial plaque at his birthplace in Smolenice.

In 2020, Slovakia issued a €10 silver coin depicting Banič.

Trnava - Boleráz airport, near Smolenice, carries Banič's name.

References

External links 
 US1108484 Parachute patent

1870 births
1941 deaths
People from the Kingdom of Hungary
People from Trnava District
Slovak scientists
Slovak inventors
Austro-Hungarian emigrants to the United States
American people of Slovak descent
Czechoslovak people of World War I